Senator Fuimaono may refer to:

A. U. Fuimaono (1924–2008), American Samoa
Lutu T. S. Fuimaono (1930–2004), Senate of American Samoa